Del-Fi Records was an American record label based in Hollywood, California and owned by Bob Keane. The label's first single released was "Caravan" by Henri Rose released in 1958, but the label was most famous for signing Ritchie Valens. Valens' first single for the label was "Come On Let's Go", which was a hit. His next single, "Donna"/"La Bamba", was an even bigger hit, and brought national notoriety to the label. Johnny Crawford, the co-star of the television series The Rifleman, was the Del-Fi artist who recorded the most hit singles.

History
In 1966, legal action was taken against Del-Fi by attorney Al Schlesinger for Anthony Music, which filed a $122,000 suit over breach of contract, fraud and money owed. The principal stockholder of the company, Anthony Hilder, claimed the dispute was over royalties not being paid as per an alleged agreement for the masters of albums by The Centurians, Dave Myers and The Surftones, and The Sentinels, and an LP  Battle of the Surf Bands.

Sister labels
Keane soon launched Stereo-Fi Records and Donna Records as sister labels. Donna Records was started in 1959, named after Ritchie Valens' hit of the same name. By 1965, Bob Keane felt the Del-Fi and Donna labels were aging, so the Bronco Records and Mustang Records labels were started in their place, capitalizing on their new, exciting themes. The Mustang label achieved fame through Bobby Fuller Four (previously on Donna Records), producing their biggest hit, "I Fought the Law" in 1965. Their fame continued into 1966, with assistance from the then A&R man Barry White, but Fuller's death later that year brought a halt to the label, and Mustang Records closed down in 1967.

Legacy
Del-Fi was briefly revived in 1987 for 7" and 12" releases of "La Bamba '87", featuring remixes of the Richie Valens classic, capitalizing on the success of the film, La Bamba. Keane resurrected the Del-Fi label in 1995 and reissued many original recordings on CD (some under the Donna label), and signed some new acts as well. In September 2003, Bob Keane sold the Del-Fi and its subsidiaries to the Warner Music Group. Today, it is now run under Rhino Entertainment and reissues some of its older material.

Various artist compilations
In 1999, the label released Del-Fi Girl Groups: Gee Baby Gee. Compiled and annotated by Steve Stanley, the CD featured 21 vintage tracks from the Del-Fi label. They were by girl groups and singers such as The Ladybugs, Brenda Holloway, Pippy Shannon, Lori Martin, Pierre And Anne-Lyse, Desda, Mary Sawrey, and seven tracks by The Sisters, a group that featured Ersi Arvizu.

New recordings
One band that has recorded for the label is The El Caminos, a Japanese surf music band who had their 1997 album Reverb Explosion released on Del-Fi. It got to #12 on the CMJ Core Radio chart.

Artists
Addrisi Brothers
Eden Ahbez
The Centurians
Johnny Crawford
Bobby Curtola
Bobby Fuller Four (Donna & Mustang)
Roy Gaines
The Gallahads
Ron Holden (Donna)
Brenda Holloway
Bruce Johnston
Little Caesar & the Romans
The Lively Ones
Outrageous Cherry
Josephine Roberto aka 'Banig'
Chan Romero
Spider Webb and the Insects (Tom Fogerty)
Ritchie Valens
Barry White (Bronco)
Frank Zappa

Later artists
The El Caminos
Kari Wuhrer

See also
Bob Keane
Ritchie Valens
List of record labels

References

Ritchie Valens
American record labels
Record labels based in California
Rock and roll record labels
Record labels established in 1958
Record labels disestablished in 2003
1958 establishments in California
Defunct companies based in Greater Los Angeles
Warner Music labels
Labels distributed by Warner Music Group
2003 disestablishments in California